Beaumont Avenue Residential District is a  historic district in Harrodsburg, Kentucky, which was listed on the National Register of Historic Places in 1989.

It includes properties along Beaumont Avenue from number 338 to number 538.  It included 14 contributing buildings and two non-contributing buildings, all being residences.  The oldest house is the Magoffin-Gaither House, at 464 Beaumont Avenue, built in 1850.

References

Historic districts on the National Register of Historic Places in Kentucky
Queen Anne architecture in Kentucky
Neoclassical architecture in Kentucky
Houses in Mercer County, Kentucky
Houses on the National Register of Historic Places in Kentucky
Neighborhoods in Kentucky
Harrodsburg, Kentucky